This is the discography of Scottish new wave/post-punk band Altered Images.

Albums

Studio albums

Compilation albums

Box sets

EPs

Singles

Other releases

References 

Discographies of British artists
Rock music group discographies
New wave discographies